Sherry Hursey is an American actress. She is best known for her recurring role as Ilene Markham on the sitcom Home Improvement and her 1988–1989 stint as Paula Carson on the soap opera Days of Our Lives.

Her other television credits include The Rookies, Happy Days, The Six Million Dollar Man, The Mary Tyler Moore Show
, Rhoda, Simon & Simon, Matlock, Step by Step, Major Dad, Dr. Quinn, Medicine Woman, NYPD Blue and CSI: Crime Scene Investigation. She also appeared in a number of television films and the theatrical films Tom and Huck (1995) and Bring It On (2000), playing the mother of Kirsten Dunst's character. In 1996, she appeared in the television film Lying Eyes.

In 2010, Hursey starred and produced the television pilot Lilly's Light, starring in the titular role. The series was about a Lilly (Hursey) a foster mother living in an enchanted lighthouse raising three foster children. Actors Mindy Sterling and Fred Willard also co-starred.

Filmography

Film

Television

References

External links

Living people
Actresses from North Carolina
American film actresses
American musical theatre actresses
American soap opera actresses
American television actresses
American voice actresses
People from Rutherfordton, North Carolina
Year of birth missing (living people)
20th-century American actresses
21st-century American actresses